The Melody Lingers On is a 1935 American film.

Plot
A piano virtuoso has a child out of wedlock to her fiance, who is killed trying to save her life. Their son is brought up by foster parents and becomes a musician. The cast was headed by Josephine Hutchinson, George Houston and John Halliday.

Production
Edward Small bought the rights to the novel in November 1934. Lillian Hellman wrote an early draft of the script. Philip Dunne was then hired to work on it with Ralph Block.

Reception
According to Dunne "The Melody Lingers On lingered not at all in theaters but died a swift and merciful death".

References

External links
 
 

1935 films
1935 musical films
American musical films
Films directed by David Burton
American black-and-white films
Films set in Italy
World War I films set on the Italian Front
Films produced by Edward Small
1930s English-language films
1930s American films